Milford is an unincorporated community located in the town of Milford, Jefferson County, Wisconsin, United States.

History
Milford came into existence as a settler community along the Crawfish River in the mid 19th century. The name is generally attributed to the ford across the Crawfish just down from the sawmill built by early settler Benjamin Nute and his partner.

Notes

Unincorporated communities in Jefferson County, Wisconsin